John Milhiser (born November 29, 1981) is an American actor and comedian. Milhiser first garnered attention for his work as a member of the Upright Citizens Brigade sketch group Serious Lunch, before achieving widespread success for his brief stint as a cast member on the NBC sketch comedy series Saturday Night Live for the 2013–2014 season.

Career 
He has been a regular performer at the Upright Citizens Brigade Theater since 2005, where he was a member of the sketch comedy group Serious Lunch, who have been featured on Late Night with Jimmy Fallon and Attack of the Show. Milhiser is a native of Belle Mead, New Jersey and he graduated in 2000 from Montgomery High School in Skillman, New Jersey. He later attended Hofstra University, where he graduated in 2004 as a Film Studies and Production major and was a member of Sigma Pi fraternity.

Milhiser made his debut on Saturday Night Live on the September 28, 2013, season premiere hosted by Tina Fey with musical guest Arcade Fire. His celebrity impressions included Jon Cryer, Matthew McConaughey, Verne Troyer (as Mini-Me from the Austin Powers movies), and Billie Joe Armstrong. On July 15, 2014, it was announced that Milhiser's contract with SNL was not renewed and he would not be returning as a cast member.

In 2014, Milhiser appeared in a supporting role in the indie film Camp Takota starring comedians Grace Helbig, Hannah Hart and Mamrie Hart. He has also made guest appearances on television programs such as Adam Ruins Everything, 2 Broke Girls, Netflix Original Series Love, and Other Space.

Personal life 
Milhiser is Saturday Night Lives second openly gay male cast member (after Terry Sweeney), as well as the one of the few LGBTQ cast members overall.

Filmography

Film

Television

Notes

References

External links 
 

1981 births
Living people
21st-century American male actors
American male television actors
American impressionists (entertainers)
American sketch comedians
American gay actors
Hofstra University alumni
Gay comedians
LGBT people from New Jersey
Male actors from New Jersey
Montgomery High School (New Jersey) alumni
People from Montgomery Township, New Jersey
Upright Citizens Brigade Theater performers
21st-century American comedians
American LGBT comedians